This is a partial discography of the opera Tannhäuser by Richard Wagner. It was first performed in Dresden on 19 October 1845. A revised version was first given in Paris on 13 March 1861.

List

References
Notes

Opera discographies